Frabosa may refer to:

 Frabosa Soprana, municipality in the Province of Cuneo in the Italian region Piedmont
 Frabosa Sottana, municipality in the Province of Cuneo in the Italian region Piedmont